Monte Patrick Montgomery (born August 11, 1966) is an American guitarist and singer-songwriter.

Early life
Born in Birmingham, Alabama, at age 13 he moved to San Antonio, Texas.

Career
The Austin, Texas based guitarist first gained notoriety in 1999, after performing on an episode of the PBS series Austin City Limits. He was named one of the "Top 50 All-Time Greatest Guitar Players" by Guitar Player Magazine and won the "Best Acoustic Guitar Player" Award at the Austin Chronicle's Austin Music Awards seven years in a row.

Montgomery composed for the ABC TV series Last Man Standing. Montgomery authored music for the criminal drama Arc (2006) In 2008, Monte appeared on the music show Live From Daryl's House.

In 2004, Alvarez Guitars created the MMY1 Monte Montgomery Signature Guitar, a model based on Montgomery's 1987 Alvarez-Yairi DY62C Acoustic-Electric Guitar.

Discography

Studio albums
Monte Montgomery [EP] (1990)
Lost & Found (1993)
1st & Repair (1998, Heart)
Mirror (1999, Heart)
Wishing Well (2001)
The Story Of Love (2003)
Architect (2004)
Monte Montgomery (2008)
Tethered (2012)
Dragonfly (2016)
A Call To Arms (2019)

Live albums
Live at the Caravan of Dreams (2002)
New & Approved (2003)
At WorkPlay (2005)

Live DVDs
At WorkPlay (2005)

Personal life
Monte has four children and in March 2009, his eldest daughter, Sofia Anna Mondini died in an accidental handgun incident.

References

External links
MonteMontgomery.net – Official site

American acoustic guitarists
American male guitarists
Living people
1966 births
Guitarists from Alabama
Musicians from Birmingham, Alabama
20th-century American guitarists
20th-century American male musicians
Provogue Records artists